Mervin Wells (birth  January 16, 1987, in St Lucia) is a Saint Lucian cricketer who played for the Saint Lucia national cricket team in Stanford 20/20 as well as Windward Islands cricket team in West Indian domestic cricket. He played as a right-handed batsman.

References

External links

1982 births
Living people
Saint Lucian cricketers
Windward Islands cricketers